Nottingham city centre is the cultural, commercial, financial and historical heart of Nottingham, England. Nottingham's city centre represents the central area of the Greater Nottingham conurbation.

The centre of the city is usually defined as the Old Market Square, one of the largest surviving town squares in the United Kingdom. Covering about 12,000 square metres, it is within the boundaries of the centuries-old Great Market Place, which covered about 22,000 square metres. A major redevelopment of the Old Market Square was completed in March 2007. Many of the main shopping streets abut the square, which is dominated by Nottingham's city hall. The building's landmark dome can be seen for miles around. Much of the ground floor of the building houses the Exchange Arcade, a boutique shopping centre.

A Bohemian quarter of the city known as Hockley has gained popularity in recent years, situated close to the Lace Market area.

The northwestern end of the city centre is home to the Nottingham Trent University city campus, which contains a mix of old and new buildings. The university's Newton building is one of the tallest buildings in Nottingham and has a prominent position on the city's skyline.

Nottingham's central railway station is located in the city centre. Nottingham Express Transit trams also service the area.

Shopping
Nottingham city centre has been voted 5th in Experian's list of the top 15 UK retail areas.

The city centre's fashion core is centred on Bridlesmith Gate, which is home to upmarket names such as Kurt Geiger, Ted Baker and Diesel. Sir Paul Smith's flagship store is located on Middle Pavement, and Hugo Boss is located on St. Peter's Gate. London-based Harvey Nichols now have plans to open a store in the Broadmarsh area but it depends on the development that is due to take place over the year.

Zones

Nottingham city centre is split into five "zones", which were introduced with the Nottingham Parksmart scheme in 2009 to signpost visitors to parking facilities and tourist attractions. The zones are named:

Lace Market
Broadmarsh
Castle
Royal
Victoria

There is also an area within the city known as the Creative Quarter.

Visitor attractions
Nottingham Castle is a popular attraction for visitors to the city due to its links with Robin Hood. The Brewhouse Yard Museum (Museum of Nottingham Life) and the Museum of Costume and Textiles are close by.

Part of Nottingham's expansive cave network is open to the public through the City of Caves attraction, and the Galleries of Justice on High Pavement were once a fully functioning Victorian courtroom.

Notable churches within the city centre include the Roman Catholic Nottingham Cathedral, and the medieval St. Mary's Church at the heart of the Lace Market.

The National Ice Centre (adjoined to Motorpoint Arena Nottingham) is located close to the city's Lace Market quarter and is the first twin Olympic ice-pad facility in the UK. It is the home of the Nottingham Panthers, a professional ice-hockey team.

Rock City is a mid-sized music venue that draws many popular bands from across the world, and so is an important part of Nottingham's music tourism scene.

Every summer the Market Square hosts the annual Nottingham Beach, funded by Mellor Events. It includes an artificial beach, beach bar and rides.

Entertainment
Nottingham, is home to a wide variety of entertainment venues, the largest of which is the 10,000-seater Motorpoint Arena Nottingham (part of the National Ice Centre), where many big-name acts perform regularly.

The city's major producing theatre, the Nottingham Playhouse, has built up a national reputation for its exciting, innovative and contemporary new works.

The Nottingham Royal Centre incorporates the 2,500-seater Royal Concert Hall and the Victorian Theatre Royal. The Royal Concert Hall is the region's top venue for classical music and regularly plays host to world-class orchestras and ballets, while the Theatre Royal is considered one of the finest venues in the country for major touring West End musicals and plays.

Nottingham is an important centre in the improvisational comedy scene in the Midlands; MissImp (Mission Improbable) is a growing force in the comedy community in Nottingham. A student group also runs at the University of Nottingham. Nottingham's branch of The Glee Club situated along the Nottingham Canal.

The Cornerhouse entertainment complex houses a multi-screen Cineworld cinema, a multitude of continental pavement-cafés and restaurants, a casino, a flight simulator and an indoor crazy 18-hole golf course.

Eastside City
Eastside City is the name of the redevelopment project that is set to transform an extensive former industrial brownfield area to the east of Nottingham city centre's historic core. This area stretches from the Nottingham-Beeston Canal in the south towards the National Ice Centre. At the heart of the regeneration zone will be The Island site which will be overhauled to become a city quarter with public open spaces, restaurants and bars and a new park for the city's inhabitants. The development will consist of new homes, offices and retail units.

Notable buildings

 Arkwright Building, Nottingham Trent University
 Newton Building, Nottingham Trent University
 Nottingham Council House
 Nottingham Playhouse
 Nottingham Castle
 Nottingham Cathedral
 St. Mary's Church
 Nottingham railway station
 Broadmarsh Shopping Centre
 Victoria Shopping Centre
 Victoria Shopping Centre apartments
 The Corner House
 National Ice Centre
 Theatre Royal
 Marco Island
 iQ Nottingham

References

External links
Nottingham City Council
Images of Nottingham

Nottingham
Areas of Nottingham
Central business districts in the United Kingdom